Fumay is a commune in the Ardennes department in northern France, very close to the Belgian border. The engineer Charles-Hippolyte de Paravey was born in Fumay.

Geography 
It is situated in the Meuse valley, the main part of the town being surrounded by a large meander of the river.

Population

Economy
Fumay is sometimes known as "The City of Slate" (La Cité de l'Ardoise) due to the slate mining which brought prosperity to the town in the nineteenth century. The last slate mine was closed in 1971.

See also
Communes of the Ardennes department

References

External links

 Official site

Communes of Ardennes (department)
Ardennes communes articles needing translation from French Wikipedia